Maya or Mayāsura is a figure in Hindu mythology. He is king of the Danavas, a demonic race, and famous for his brilliant architecture. His most important creations include the Mayasabha (the hall of illusions) for the Pandavas and Tripura (the three cities) for the sons of Tarakasura. He is also mentioned as the father-in-law of Ravana in the epic Ramayana.

In the Mahabharata 
Mayasura is mentioned to be a son of the sage Kashyapa and his wife Danu.
Mayasura had befriended a Nāga named Takshaka and lived with him in the area of Khandavprastha along with his family and friends, but when the Pandavas came there after the partition of Hastinapur, Arjun burnt the entire forest, forcing Takshaka to flee and killing everyone else. This made Mayasura decide to surrender to the Pandavas. Krishna was ready to forgive him and in return, Mayasura built a grand palace named Maya-Mahal / MayaSabha, where the Pandavas would perform the Rajsuya Yagna. Mayasura also offers him gifts like a bow, a sword etc. He gives a mace to Arjuna's brother Bhima named Vrigodharam. In some versions of the Mahabharata he also gives Arjuna the Gandiva bow.

In the Ramayana 
The Uttara Kanda of the epic Ramayana mentions that during his visit to Svarga (heaven), Maya married an apsara (heavenly nymph) named Hema. They had two sons — Mayavi and Dundubhi — and a daughter Mandodari, who later married Ravana, the Rakshasa ruler of Lanka and the main antagonist of the epic. In some versions of the Ramayana, Maya had another daughter named Dhanyamalini, who also married Ravana.

In Folklores
In some folktales from Bengal, Mayasura is married to Oladevi, the goddess of cholera.

See also
Mara (demon)
Mamuni Mayan
Oladevi

References 

Danavas
Rakshasa in the Ramayana
Characters in the Mahabharata